Christopher Ralph Hammersley (4 January 1903 – January 1994) was a British fencer. He competed in the team foil event at the 1936 Summer Olympics. In 1936, he won the foil title at the British Fencing Championships.

References

1903 births
1994 deaths
British male fencers
Olympic fencers of Great Britain
Fencers at the 1936 Summer Olympics
People from Chelsea, London